Domingo Tomás Hernández Bethencourt (October 9, 1915 – June 2, 1984), known professionally as Tom Hernández (or Tommy Hernandez),  was an American theater, films, and television actor, who played supporting roles, usually Hispanics, throughout his career. He was mainly known for their roles in the American film The 3rd Voice (1960), and in the Spanish films "Fuerza Mortal" (1980) and "Tunka, el guerrero" (1983). However, he is best remembered by his interpretation of Don Diego character at the San Diego's fair (California) Del Mar Fair during almost of four decades until his death in 1984. He held the position of goodwill ambassador of the fair, promoting it and he welcomed people that came to the fair with his greeting in Spanish "¡Bienvenidos, Amigos!" ("Welcome Friends!"), greeting for which he was known.  He was brother of also actor Pepe Hern and uncle of present-day actor Justin Lopez from The Three Stooges (2012 film).

Biography 
Hernández was born on October 9, 1915, in Puerto de la Cruz, Tenerife (Canary Islands, Spain), to Domingo Hernández and Dominga Bethencourt. In 1920, Hernandez emigrated with his parents and an eldest brother to the United States when he was five. He also had a younger brother (who was born in the U.S., twelve years after his arrival there), the future actor Pepe Hern.

Eventually, Hernandez became interested in film, and got jobs of helper, which led him to small roles with marked Hispanic roots. Domingo chosen the Tom Hernandez stage name, seeking a certain approach to their host country, but without completely abandoning their roots.

After working in theater for a long time, he was offered a small role in Tarzan and the Slave Girl (1950), and during the '50s was common to see him at many American films and some episodes of some American TV series, playing supporting roles.

The film in which, perhaps, had the greater role in his Hollywood career was "The 3rd Voice" (1960)

That brief moment of brilliance on the big screen in the early 60 allowed to Tom Hernandez access to more regular jobs in renowned  television series as " The Virginian" (1962), "Mission: Impossible" (1965) and "Daniel Boone" (1969), one of the last TV series in which he worked. Already into the '70s, his appearances on screen were losing relevance, focusing thereafter, basically, in his job as goodwill ambassador in the Del Mar Fair, in San Diego (California), in which he had already begun to work from the 40s.

Although he continued to participate in some movies, highlighting its roles in the Spanish films Cuatro locos buscan manicomio (1980), Fuerza mortal (1980) and Tunka, el guerrero (1983).

By other way, since 1947 Hernández began to interpret Don Diego's character at the Del Mar Fair in San Diego (California), appearing as master of ceremonies for the annual meeting  and occupying the work of promoter the fair, being goodwill ambassador in this fairgrounds.

He combined his work in films and its role as master of ceremonies for the fair until the last years of his life. He died on June 2, 1984  in Los Angeles, California.

Legacy 
 On the death of Hernandez, the council of Del Mar Fair decided to exhibit a bronze statue of 16 feet  dedicated to Hernández as Don Diego, created by artist Maher Morcos, at the entrance to the fair. The statue was presented in 1985.
 In honor to him was created also The Don Diego Fund in 1986, a nonprofit scholarship program of the San Diego County Fair to economically help to the outstanding San Diego County high school students who have participated in the annual San Diego County Fair or other events concluded by the Del Mar Fairgrounds. Thus, this fund has delivered over $556,000 in scholarships and grants along its trajectory and has helped more than 130 students achieve a college degree. The Don Diego Fund is also a tax-exempt 501(c)(3) organization.

Trivia 
 The character "Don Diego" was based on the landowner Don Diego Alvarado, owner of a great land in what is now Del Mar, California, in 1800 year.
 In the beauty contest at the fair, Hernández met a girl named Raquel Tejada, who was one of the contestants of this contest, and who later would become the actress Raquel Welch.

Filmography 
This is a list of films of Tom Hernández

TV series
This is a list of television series in which he has appeared.

References 

1915 births
Spanish emigrants to the United States
American people of Canarian descent
People from Puerto de la Cruz
Male actors from Los Angeles
1984 deaths
20th-century American male actors